Black Moon Rising  is the eighth album by the Swedish Folk metal band Falconer, released on June 10, 2014, through Metal Blade Records. The track listing was revealed and the album went up for order on April 16, 2014.

Track listing

References 

2014 albums
Falconer (band) albums
Metal Blade Records albums